Oehmichen is a surname, likely of French origin. Notable people with the surname include:

Étienne Oehmichen (1884-1955), French engineer and helicopter designer
Herbert Oehmichen (1915-1990), American handball player
Isabelle Oehmichen (born 1961), French classical pianist